Boris Kuznetsov may refer to:

 Boris Kuznetsov (philosopher)  (1903–1984)
 Boris Kuznetsov (footballer, born 1928) (1928–1999), Soviet football player who represented USSR internationally in the 1950s
 Boris Kuznetsov (politician) (1935–2013), Russian politician
 Boris Kuznetsov (lawyer) (born 1944), Russian lawyer
 Boris Kuznetsov (boxer) (1947–2006), Soviet boxer
 Boris Kuznetsov (athlete) (born 1947), Soviet long-distance runner
 Boris Kuznetsov (footballer, born 1957), Soviet and Russian footballer for FC Spartak Moscow, PFC CSKA Moscow and FC Lokomotiv Moscow